Berrydale Park is a  public park in the Montavilla neighborhood, in southeast Portland, Oregon. The park was acquired in 1956.

References

External links

 

1956 establishments in Oregon
Montavilla, Portland, Oregon
Parks in Portland, Oregon
Southeast Portland, Oregon